Somewhere Tonight (also titled 1-900-Tonight) is a 2011 Dutch comedy-drama film starring John Turturro.

Turturro won the Best Actor Award at the San Diego Film Festival for his performance in this film in 2011.

Plot

Cast
John Turturro as Leroy
Katherine Borowitz as Patti
Max Casella as Fred
Elizabeth Marvel as Martha
Lynn Cohen as Mrs. Pecorino

References

External links
 
 

Dutch comedy-drama films
2011 comedy-drama films
English-language Dutch films
2011 films
2010s English-language films